Donald Leroy Bonker (born March 7, 1937 in Denver, Colorado) is an American former congressman for the state of Washington and a Democrat. He served as a member of the United States House of Representatives from 1975 to 1989, representing Washington's third Congressional district.

He is a resident of Bainbridge Island, Washington.

Biography 
Bonker attended public schools in Westminster, Colorado. He received his Associate of Arts degree from Clark College in Vancouver, Washington, in 1962; his Bachelor of Arts from Lewis & Clark College in Portland, Oregon, in 1964; and completed graduate work at American University in Washington, D.C. 

Bonker served in the United States Coast Guard as first class yeoman from 1955 to 1959.

Political career 
He served as aide to United States Senator Maurine Brown Neuberger from 1964 to 1965, Clark County auditor in Vancouver from 1966 to 1974, and as a delegate to Washington State Democratic conventions from 1968 to 1970.

Bonker ran for Washington Secretary of State in 1972, but was defeated by incumbent Republican Lud Kramer.

Tenure in Congress 
Bonker was elected as a moderate Democrat to the 94th and to the six succeeding Congresses (January 3, 1975 – January 3, 1989). He did not run for reelection in 1988 so he could run for nomination to the United States Senate, where he narrowly lost in the primary to Democrat Mike Lowry, who was defeated in the general election by Republican Slade Gorton. 

During his time in the House, Bonker was a senior member of the House Foreign Affairs Committee and chairman of the Subcommittee on International Economic Policy and Trade. He also served on the President's Export Council and headed former House Speaker Tip O'Neill's Trade Task Force, which led to passage of the Omnibus Foreign Trade and Competitiveness Act. During his tenure in Congress, Bonker authored and was a principal sponsor of significant trade legislation, such as the Export Trading Company Act and the Export Administration Act.

He helped establish the Grays Harbor National Wildlife Refuge and the Mount St. Helens National Volcanic Monument, added Protection Island to the National Wildlife Refuge system, preserved the Point of Arches in the Olympic National Park, added 250,000 acres (1000 km²) to the 1984 Washington Wilderness Act, and banned the export of Western Redcedar.

Later career 
In 1992, Bonker again ran for a U.S. Senate seat, but was defeated in the primary by the eventual winner, Democratic Senator Patty Murray. In 2000, he ran for Secretary of State again, winning the party nomination in the primary, but losing in the general to Sam Reed.

Bonker is now the president and CEO of the International Management and Development Institute, on the board of the Foundation for U.S.-Russia Business Cooperation, and is executive vice president of APCO Worldwide.

In 2009, Bonker was the target of significant criticism by Democrats for endorsing Republican Susan Hutchison for King County Executive against Democratic favorite and eventual winner Dow Constantine.

He is the author of America's Trade Crisis, published by Houghton Mifflin, and is a writer and speaker on U.S. trade policy. His monthly column on trade policy appears in a number of newspapers around the country.

Bonker is a member of the ReFormers Caucus of Issue One.

See also
 Washington state congressional delegates

References

External links
 

1937 births
Living people
American University alumni
County auditors in the United States
Politicians from Denver
Lewis & Clark College alumni
Democratic Party members of the United States House of Representatives from Washington (state)
Politicians from Vancouver, Washington
United States congressional aides
Members of Congress who became lobbyists